Deadwood is an unincorporated community in Lane County, Oregon, United States. It is located on Oregon Route 36, in the Oregon Coast Range.

Deadwood was named after Deadwood Creek, a tributary of Lake Creek in the Siuslaw River basin. Deadwood Creek was so-named because of the dead timber snags next to its banks, which had resulted from a series of wildfires in the area. Deadwood post office was established in 1884. The post office was discontinued to the community of Greenleaf in 1914, but was reestablished in 1950.

Deadwood is the home of Alpha Farm, an intentional community established in 1971. The farm owned the Alpha Bit, a café and book/gift store in Mapleton but was sold in 2018. Other residents include the artists Ernie and Mary Lou Goertzen who lived in the old Deadwood schoolhouse from 1975.

References 

Unincorporated communities in Lane County, Oregon
1884 establishments in Oregon
Populated places established in 1884
Unincorporated communities in Oregon